Palahniuk, Palaniuk,  Palahnuk, or Palahnyuk is a Ukrainian surname. Notable people with the surname include:

 Chuck Palahniuk (born 1962), American transgressional novelist and freelance journalist
 Volodymyr Palahnyuk (a.k.a. Jack Palance; 1919–2006), American film actor
 Brandon Palaniuk (born 1984), Professional Angler, 2017 Bassmaster Angler of the Year
 Sam Palahnuk (born 1961), American video game designer
 Donald Walter Palahnuk Jr (a.k.a. 龍岩波; born 1965), American biochemical engineer and applied mathematician
 Vasyl Palahnyuk (born 1991), Ukrainian footballer 

Ukrainian-language surnames